Ivan Grigoryevich Bubnov (18 January 1872 – 13 March 1919) was a Russian marine engineer and designer of submarines for the Imperial Russian Navy.

Bubnov was born in Nizhny Novgorod and graduated from the Marine Engineering College in Kronstadt in 1891. He graduated from the Nikolayev Marine Academy in 1896. He initially joined the Admiralty Shipyard in Saint Petersburg and worked as a constructor on the battleship Poltava.

In 1900, he was appointed Chief Assistant at the Russian Admiralty test tank and was involved in the design of the first Russian submarine, the Delfin. In 1903, he became the Russian Admiralty's submarine designer and was responsible for the following submarine classes:
 Kasatka class
 Minoga
 Akula
 Morzh class
 Bars class

In 1904, Bubnov became a lecturer at the Saint Petersburg Polytechnical University. He was commissioned into the Navy in 1907 and was head of the Admiralty test tank between 1908 and 1914.

Bubnov was promoted to Major General in the Corps of Naval Engineers in 1912. Between 1912 and 1917, he was a consultant to the Baltic Works in Saint Petersburg and the Nobel & Lessner shipyard in Reval.

Bubnov died of typhoid in Petrograd in 1919.

References
This article is sourced by translation from the Russian Wikipedia

1872 births
1919 deaths
Military personnel from Nizhny Novgorod
People from Nizhegorodsky Uyezd
Russian marine engineers
Russian inventors
Submarine pioneers
Deaths from typhoid fever